Mickael Marquet (born 10 December 1981 in Alfortville, France) is a French former professional footballer who played as an attacking midfielder. He made five appearances in Ligue 1 for Ajaccio in the 2002–03 season and made 16 appearances and scored two goals in Ligue 2 for Creteil in the 2001–02 season.

References

Living people
1981 births
French footballers
Association football midfielders
Ligue 1 players
Ligue 2 players
Championnat National 2 players
US Créteil-Lusitanos players
AC Ajaccio players
Red Star F.C. players
Footballers from Val-de-Marne
People from Alfortville